Kalambo may refer to:

Kalambo Constituency, a parliamentary constituency in Rukwa Region, southwestern Tanzania
Kalambo District, a district in Rukwa Region, southwestern Tanzania
Kalambo River, a river in Tanzania and Zambia
Kalambo Falls, waterfall on the border of Tanzania and Zambia